Arjona megapotamica is a rare species of flowering plant in the family Schoepfiaceae, native to a small area of southeastern Brazil, where it grows in cool mountain grasslands. Like other Arjona species, it is thought to be a root hemiparasite. It is a small perennial plant growing as a bunch of short twigs from a woody central knob. , Arjona schumanniana was regarded by some sources as a synonym, by others as an independent species.

Description
Arjona megapotamica is a small, herbaceous, perennial root hemiparasite. A large number of unbranched stems, 15–20(–30) cm in height, sprout from a small woody central base, called a 'xylopodium'. These stems are 1–1.5 cm in diameter, sulcate (grooved in transect profile) and glabrous (hairless). The linear leaves are alternately distributed throughout the length of the stem. The leaves are simple, sessile, coloured green, glabrous, with the leaf blade 2–3 cm long and 1–1.5 cm wide. The leaves are tipped in a point, and have 1 to 3 prominent veins.

The stems are topped by a terminal inflorescence, shaped as a spiked raceme. It is 
about 2 cm in length and densely packed with flowers. The 0.6–2 cm long, linear bracts, are tipped in sharp points and villous along their margins. The flowers are sessile. They have two linear, villous bracteoles 2–3 mm in length. The perianth is tubular, hypocrateriform, yellow, 10–12 mm in length, a few trichomes dispersed internally, with five lobes. The five stamens have dorsifixed anthers, and are oblong. The ovary is pilose, about 2 mm in length, and with pendulous ovules, a filiform, glabrous style, and a slightly 3-lobulate stigma.

The ovoid fruit is ca. 3–4 mm in length with a truncated end and 10 ribs. The fruit, when eventually removed from or having fallen off the infructescence, leave an off-white scar at the base of the bract. The seeds have a cylindrical embryo.

Taxonomy

In 1916 Carl Skottsberg published an article on the genus Arjona, in which he noted that specimens in the Berlin Herbarium had been labelled by Karl Moritz Schumann as A. brasiliensis, but that he was unable to find a formal species description for the name. In 1930, Robert Pilger published a description of the specimens, which he noted had been collected by Friedrich Sellow sometime in early 19th century, under the name A. schumanniana. He rejected the epithet basiliensis, since he found that it was unclear whether the specimens had actually been collected in Brazil – Sellow had also travelled to Uruguay. , "Arjona brasiliensis" was not listed in the International Plant Names Index, while A. schumanniana was accepted as a separate species by Plants of the World Online. Both these names are regarded as synonyms of A. megapotamica by the Flora del Conosur. A. schumanniana was synonymised with A. megapotamica by the Brazilian botanist João Rodrigues de Mattos in the Santalales volume of the Flora Ilustrada Catarinense of 1967.

Although A. megapotamica had not yet been named in 1916, Skottsberg placed "A. brasiliensis" in his section Xylarjona, based on the woody xylopodium, together with A. longifolia.

Distribution

Arjona megapotamica is endemic to southeastern Brazil. The species formerly occurred in the state of Rio Grande do Sul on granite hills which surround the coastal city of Porto Alegre. These hills have now been extensively developed, and the species was officially declared locally extinct in Rio Grande do Sul in 2014 (Decreto Estadual RS 52.109). It also occurs in the eastern part of the Santa Catarina Plateau in Santa Catarina state according to Mattos, where it presumably may still be found.

Ecology
It is a root hemiparasite growing in cool montane grasslands. On Morro da Polícia, a 286 m high granite hill, it grew in a shrubby montane grassland. In Santa Catarina it has been collected at 1,670 m altitude in the Serra Geral (Urubici municipality), and 950 m in Lages municipality.

Conservation
It occurs in Aparados da Serra National Park.

References

Schoepfiaceae
Endemic flora of Brazil
Plants described in 1928
Taxa named by Gustaf Oskar Andersson Malme